Pleasant Run Township is one of nine townships in Lawrence County, Indiana, United States. As of the 2010 census, its population was 1,883 and it contained 862 housing units.

History
Pleasant Run Township was established in 1818. It was named after the Pleasant Run creek.

Geography

Unincorporated towns
 Bartlettsville at 
 Heltonville at 
 Zelma at

Cemeteries
The township contains these five cemeteries: Bailey, Covey, Faubion, Hawkins and Tanksley.

Major highways
  U.S. Route 50

Lakes
 Rainbow Lake

Demographics

School districts
 North Lawrence Community Schools

Political districts
 Indiana's 9th congressional district
 State House District 65
 State Senate District 44

References
 
 United States Census Bureau 2008 TIGER/Line Shapefiles
 IndianaMap

External links
 Indiana Township Association
 United Township Association of Indiana
 City-Data.com page for Pleasant Run Township

Townships in Lawrence County, Indiana
Townships in Indiana